The Wimbledon Range is a small subrange of the Kitimat Ranges, located on the southern end of Gribbell Island, British Columbia, Canada.

References

Kitimat Ranges